Hat Check Honey is a 1944 American musical-comedy film directed by Edward F. Cline. It stars Leon Errol and Grace McDonald.

Dan Briggs and his son work as a duo in a carnival act, but the father breaks up the act so his son can pursue his solo career.  As he works his way from busboy at the Penguin Club, to boy singer, then to Hollywood, romantic entanglements and a father-son reconciliation are woven among several musical numbers.

Cast

 Leon Errol as 'Happy' Dan Briggs
 Grace McDonald as Susan Brent
 Walter Catlett as Tim Martel
 Richard David as Dan Briggs Jr. 
 Ramsay Ames as Mona Mallory
 Jimmy Cash as Band Singer Jimmy Cash
 Milburn Stone as David Courtland
 Mary Gordon as Jennie
 Freddie Slack as himself
 Harry Owens as himself 
 Ted Weems as himself 
 Lee Bennett as Alan Dane
 Russell Hicks as J.J. Worthington
 Chester Clute as Uniformed Officer
 Emmett Vogan as Lym
 Jack Rice as C.B.
 Minna Phillips as Flossie
 Eddie Acuff as Cameraman
 Claire Whitney as Mrs. Worthington
 Ray Walker as Gabby Post
 Unbilled players include Neely Edwards

See also
List of American films of 1944

External links
 
 
 Turner Classic Movies page

1944 films
Films directed by Edward F. Cline
Universal Pictures films
1944 musical comedy films
American musical comedy films
American black-and-white films
1940s American films